The 2015 Windward Islands Tournament is an association football tournament that took place in St. Lucia. It has been organised by the Windward Islands Football Association (WIFA).

Matches

Goal scorers

References 

2015 in Saint Lucian sport
Windward
Windward Islands Tournament
Wind